Alastor bilaminatus is a species of wasp in the family Vespidae.

References

bilaminatus
Insects described in 1942